Howard R. Wood (1887–1958) was a North Dakota Republican Party politician who served as the 12th Lieutenant Governor of North Dakota under Governors Lynn Frazier and Ragnvald A. Nestos. Wood also served in the North Dakota House from 1917 to 1918.

Notes

Lieutenant Governors of North Dakota
1887 births
1958 deaths
Republican Party members of the North Dakota House of Representatives
20th-century American politicians
Speakers of the North Dakota House of Representatives